The 2023 Purdue Fort Wayne Mastodons men's volleyball team represents Purdue University Fort Wayne in the 2023 NCAA Division I & II men's volleyball season. The Mastodons, led by eighth year head coach Ryan Perrotte, play their home games at Hilliard Gates Sports Center. The Mastodons are members of the Midwestern Intercollegiate Volleyball Association and were picked to finish fifth in the MIVA in the preseason poll.

Roster

Schedule

 *-Indicates conference match.
 Times listed are Eastern Time Zone.

Broadcasters
King: Mike Maahs & Victoria Brisack
NJIT: Mike Maahs & Steve Florio
Carthage: Mike Maahs & Steve Florio
Missouri S&T: 
Harvard: 
Sacred Heart: 
Queens: 
George Mason: 
Maryville: 
Lindenwood: 
Quincy: 
Ohio State: 
Ball State: 
McKendree: 
Lewis: 
Loyola Chicago: 
Hawai'i: 
Charleston (WV): 
Loyola Chicago: 
McKendree:
Lewis: 
Quincy: 
Lindenwood: 
Ohio State: 
Ball State:

Rankings 

^The Media did not release a Pre-season poll.

Honors
To be filled in upon completion of the season.

References

2023 in sports in Indiana
2023 NCAA Division I & II men's volleyball season
2023 team
Purdue Fort Wayne